Mint Mobile, LLC is a mobile virtual network operator in the United States on the T-Mobile network. It requires the purchase of a physical SIM card or eSIM online and, except for a trial period, prepayment for at least three months of service.

History
The company was founded in 2015 as Mint SIM, a subsidiary of Ultra Mobile, by David Glickman, also the founder of Ultra Mobile, and Rizwan Kassim.

In November 2019, the corporate spin-off of the company from Ultra Mobile was completed and Ryan Reynolds acquired a 20%–25% ownership stake in the company. Reynolds and founder Glickman both served on the board of directors for The Michael J. Fox Foundation and Glickman was impressed with how Reynolds handled marketing for Deadpool.

In March 2023, T-Mobile US agreed to acquire Ka’ena Corporation as well as subsidiaries and brands: Mint Mobile a successful budget direct-to-consumer (D2C) prepaid wireless brand in the U.S; Ultra Mobile, a unique wireless service that offers international calling options to communities across the country for up to $1.35 billion. Ryan Reynolds, who has a minority ownership stake in Mint Mobile, will stay on in his “creative role on behalf of Mint" where he serves as a spokesperson. T-Mobile's CEO Mike Sievert assured customers that Mint's current $15 per month plan would remain in place and that Mint's founders will also stay on and manage what “will generally operate as a separate business unit.”

Awards and recognition
In 2018, the company won an award from WhistleOut for having the best budget prepaid wireless plan.

In 2021, the company was named the fastest growing company in America and was also listed among the best places to work by American City Business Journals.

The company was ranked by U.S. News & World Report 2nd for Best Cell Phone Plans of 2022, behind Tello Mobile.

The company's plans are ranked as "best for overall value" by TechRadar.

See also
 List of United States mobile virtual network operators

References

External links
 

2015 establishments in California
American companies established in 2015
Companies based in Costa Mesa, California
Internet service providers of the United States
Mobile phone companies of the United States
Mobile virtual network operators
Privately held companies based in California
Telecommunications companies established in 2015